Alexander Hershaw Parker (2 August 1935 – 7 January 2010) was a Scottish football player and manager.  Parker played for Falkirk, Everton and Scotland, amongst others. Parker was named in Falkirk's Team of the Millennium and Everton's Hall of Fame.

Playing career

Falkirk
Parker, a fullback, began his career with Kello Rovers, turning semi-professional when he joined Falkirk in 1952. The highlight of Parker's time with the Bairns was their 1957 Scottish Cup victory, as they defeated Kilmarnock in a replayed final.

Everton
Parker moved to Merseyside in June 1958 when Everton paid £18,000 in a double signing of Parker and Eddie O'Hara both from Falkirk. Parker's Toffees debut was delayed by his requirement to fulfil National Service in Cyprus. He eventually became a stalwart in the side which won the 1962–63 league championship, finishing six points ahead of runners-up Tottenham.

After this triumph, however, hamstring injuries started to trouble Parker, and he left Goodison Park in 1965.

Southport

He joined Southport for £2,000. He stayed 3 years with the Sandgrounders.

Ballymena United

Parker next moved to Northern Ireland to become player-manager of Ballymena United.

Drumcondra

He signed for Drumcondra F.C. in December 1969 and made his League of Ireland debut at Tolka Park on 4 January 1970 in a 3–1 defeat to Dundalk. He left for after only three months to return to the UK.

International
Parker gained his first cap for Scotland against Portugal in 1955 while playing for Falkirk. He was selected in the squad for the 1958 FIFA World Cup, making one appearance against Paraguay. This also transpired to be his final national team cap, which some regarded as "perverse"; former teammate Alex Young stated that Parker was still the best player in his position in Britain. Parker also represented the Scottish League XI.

Southport manager

Parker returned to Souhtport where he was given a coaching role. Two months later he was promoted to manager but this appointment lasted only a single season.

After football

After his retirement from the footballing world, Parker became a publican in Runcorn. He then lived in Gretna, Dumfriesshire.

Parker died of a heart attack on 7 January 2010.

Career statistics

International appearances

Honours
Falkirk
 Scottish Cup: 1956–57

Everton
First Division: 1962–63
FA Charity Shield: 1963

 Southport
Fourth Division: promotion 1966-67

 Scotland
British Home Championship: 1955–56 (shared)

 Individual
Rex Kingsley Footballer of the Year: 1957
Falkirk FC Hall of Fame
Gwladys Street's Hall of Fame
Falkirk FC Millennium XI

References

External links

Brief Biography at legends section of official Everton site

1935 births
2010 deaths
Footballers from Irvine, North Ayrshire
Scottish footballers
Scotland international footballers
Kello Rovers F.C. players
Falkirk F.C. players
Everton F.C. players
Southport F.C. players
1958 FIFA World Cup players
Scottish Football League players
English Football League players
NIFL Premiership players
Scottish football managers
Southport F.C. managers
Scottish Junior Football Association players
Scottish Football League representative players
Scotland under-23 international footballers
Ballymena United F.C. players
Drumcondra F.C. players
League of Ireland players
Ballymena United F.C. managers
Association football fullbacks
Publicans